Timothy Bainey Jr. (born April 24, 1978) is an American stock car racing driver. He is a veteran of the Hooters Pro Cup Series and also made starts in what is now the ARCA Menards Series, the NASCAR Xfinity and Truck Series, and the East Series. He was born in Philipsburg, Pennsylvania.

Racing career
Bainey began his racing career at Clearfield Speedway in Pennsylvania in 1988, winning the track championship in 1995. Following competing on a limited schedule in the ARCA Re/MAX Series between 1997 and 2000, Bainey raced for a number of years in the USAR Hooters Pro Cup Series, competing in the series' North Division; he posted one top 5 finish and a best national points finish of 21st over 8 years and 78 races of competition, while he finished in the top 10 in North Division points three times during his Pro Cup career. Bainey also competed in late model races across southern New England during the early to mid 2000s.

Bainey made his debut in NASCAR competition in the Busch North Series at Holland International Speedway in 2005, finishing 17th in his first race in the series. He made his debut in the Camping World Truck Series at Dover International Speedway in 2009, finishing 15th, his best career finish in the series, and on the lead lap in his first race; he also led a lap during the event. He would make 7 additional starts in the series over the next two years, with his last start coming in September 2010 at New Hampshire Motor Speedway in a truck owned by Dale Brackett.

After over a year's hiatus from racing, Bainey returned to NASCAR competition in 2012, driving for SR² Motorsports at Dover in the Nationwide Series 5-hour Energy 200. He started 41st, was wrecked by race leader Joey Logano after 144 laps of competition, and finished 28th.

Bainey also competed in the K&N Pro Series East event at CNB Bank Raceway Park, a track he co-owns along with his father, Tim Bainey Sr., in July 2012, finishing 10th.

Personal life
Bainey is married to Nikki.

Motorsports career results

NASCAR
(key) (Bold – Pole position awarded by qualifying time. Italics – Pole position earned by points standings or practice time. * – Most laps led.)

Nationwide Series

Camping World Truck Series

K&N Pro Series East

ARCA Bondo/Mar-Hyde Series
(key) (Bold – Pole position awarded by qualifying time. Italics – Pole position earned by points standings or practice time. * – Most laps led.)

References

External links
 
 

Living people
1978 births
People from Philipsburg, Centre County, Pennsylvania
Racing drivers from Pennsylvania
NASCAR drivers
ARCA Menards Series drivers
CARS Tour drivers